is a railway station on the Hakodate Main Line in Otaru, Hokkaido, Japan, operated by Hokkaido Railway Company (JR Hokkaido). The station is numbered "S14".

Lines
Minami-Otaru Station is served by the Hakodate Main Line.

Layout
The station has one island Platform with two tracks. The platform is in a shallow cutting. The station has automated ticket machines, automated turnstiles which accept Kitaca, and a "Midori no Madoguchi" staffed ticket office.

Platforms

History
As one of the intermediate station on the Horonai Railway,  opened on November 11, 1880 provisionally and on November 28 formally. On May 22, 1881 the station was relocated and renamed  after the station was burned down. The present name Minami-Otaru was given on July 15, 1920 when the former Chūō Otaru Station, located closer to the city center, became Otaru Station. 

The station became the junction of the lines of Hokkaido Colliery and Railway Company (former Horonai Railway) and the Hokkaido Railway on August 1, 1905. After the nationalization of the two companies in 1906 and 1907, the trunk line connecting Hakodate and Sapporo via Otaru was named the Hakodate Main Line and its branch between Minami-Otaru (then called Otaru) and Temiya was named the Temiya Line. The Temiya Line was abandoned in 1985.

See also

 List of railway stations in Japan

References

Railway stations in Japan opened in 1880
Railway stations in Otaru